Pterostylis hispidula, commonly known as the small nodding greenhood or box greenhood, is a plant in the orchid family Orchidaceae and is endemic to eastern Australia. Nodding greenhoods have flowers which "nod" or lean forwards, have a deeply notched sinus and a curved, hairy labellum. This species is similar to Pterostylis nutans but is smaller and the flowers do not lean as far forward as in that species.

Description
Pterostylis hispidula, is a terrestrial,  perennial, deciduous, herb with an underground tuber. The leaves are green to yellowish, have a wavy or crinkled edge and a distinct petiole. There is a wide gap at each side of the flower between the petals and the lateral sepals. Flowering occurs from March to July.

Taxonomy and naming
Pterostylis hispidula was first formally described in 1880 by Robert D. FitzGerald who noted that he had only seen it in Hunters Hill in Sydney and at Springwood in the Blue Mountains. The specific epithet (hispidula) is a Latin word meaning "bristly", "rough", "hairy" or prickly".

Distribution and habitat
Pterostylis hispidula occurs in Queensland south from Fraser Island to Batemans Bay in New South Wales. It grows in a range of habitats from coastal scrub to rainforest margins.

References

hispidula
Endemic orchids of Australia
Orchids of New South Wales
Plants described in 1880